The Roman Catholic Archdiocese of Lubumbashi is the Metropolitan See for the Ecclesiastical province of Lubumbashi in the Democratic Republic of the Congo.

History 

 1910.08.05: Established as Apostolic Prefecture of Katanga, on territory split from the Apostolic Vicariate of Léopoldville
 1922.07.18: Lost territory to establish the Apostolic Prefecture of Lulua Katanga (now its suffragan dioceses of Kamina and Kolwesi)
 1925.05.12: Lost territory to establish the Apostolic Prefecture of Upper Luapula (now its suffragan Sakania–Kipushi)
 1932.03.22: Promoted as Apostolic Vicariate of Katanga, still exempt, i.e. directly subject to the Holy See 
 1959.11.10: Promoted as Metropolitan Archdiocese of Elisabethville 
 1966.05.30: Renamed as Metropolitan Archdiocese of Lubumbashi
 1977.03.05: Lost territory to the suffragan Roman Catholic Diocese of Sakania–Kipushi
 Enjoyed a papal visit by Pope John Paul II in August 1985.

Special churches
The seat of the archbishop is the Cathédrale Saints Pierre et Paul in Lubumbashi.

Bishops

Ordinaries in reverse chronological order
 Metropolitan Archbishops of Lubumbashi (Latin Rite), below
 Archbishop Fulgence Muteba Mugalu (2021.05.22 – ...)
 Archbishop Jean-Pierre Tafunga Mbayo, S.D.B. (2010.12.01 – 2021.03.31)
 Archbishop Floribert Songasonga Mwitwa (1998.05.22 – 2010.12.01)
 Archbishop Eugène Kabanga Songasonga (1967.04.13 – 1998.03.25)
 Archbishop José Floriberto Cornelis, O.S.B. (1959.11.10 – 1967.04.13); see below
Vicars Apostolic of Katanga (Latin Rite), below
 Bishop José Floriberto Cornelis, O.S.B. (1958.11.27 – 1959.11.10); see above
 Bishop Jean-Félix de Hemptinne, O.S.B. (1932.03.15 – 1958.02.06); see below
Prefect Apostolic of Katanga (Latin Rite), below
 Father Jean-Félix de Hemptinne, O.S.B. (1910.08.06 – 1932.03.15); see above

Coadjutor archbishop
"Jean-Pierre Tafunga Mbayo, S.D.B. (2008-2010)

Suffragan dioceses
 Kalemie–Kirungu
 Kamina
 Kilwa–Kasenga
 Kolwezi
 Kongolo
 Manono
 Sakania–Kipushi

See also
Roman Catholicism in the Democratic Republic of the Congo

Sources
 GCatholic.org

Roman Catholic dioceses in the Democratic Republic of the Congo
Christian organizations established in 1905
Roman Catholic dioceses and prelatures established in the 20th century
1910 establishments in the Belgian Congo
A